Total Divas was an American reality television series that premiered on July 28, 2013, on E! The series gave viewers an inside look of the lives of female WWE Superstars from their work within WWE to their personal lives. Behind the scene footage of the Divas is also included.

In June 2021, Essentially Sports reported that the E! Network had cancelled Total Divas and its sister show Total Bellas, citing low ratings and a lack of interest from those involved.

Series overview

Episodes

Season 1 (2013)

Season 2 (2014)

Summer Rae joined the cast of Total Divas; JoJo departed as a series regular.

Season 3 (2014–15)

Alicia Fox, Paige, and Rosa Mendes joined the cast of Total Divas; Naomi and Summer Rae departed as series regulars.

Season 4 (2015)

Naomi rejoined the cast of Total Divas; Cameron and Rosa Mendes departed as series regulars.

Season 5 (2016)

Mandy Rose joined the cast of Total Divas, as well as Rosa Mendes rejoining; Naomi departed as a series regular.

Season 6 (2016–17)

Lana, Maryse, and Renee Young joined the cast of Total Divas, as well as Naomi rejoining; Alicia Fox, Mandy Rose, and Rosa Mendes departed as series regulars.

Season 7 (2017–18)

Alexa Bliss, Carmella, and Nia Jax joined the cast of Total Divas; Eva Marie, Paige, and Renee Young departed as series regulars.

Season 8 (2018)

Paige rejoined the cast of Total Divas; Alexa Bliss, Carmella, and Maryse departed as series regulars.

Season 9 (2019)

Ronda Rousey and Sonya Deville joined the cast of Total Divas, as well as Carmella rejoining; Brie & Nikki Bella, Lana, and Paige departed as series regulars.

References

External links

 
 

Lists of American non-fiction television series episodes
Lists of reality television series episodes
Total Divas